was a town located in Hayami District, Ōita Prefecture, Japan.

As of 2003, the town had an estimated population of 8,590 and the density of 59.77 persons per km2. The total area was 143.71 km2.

On October 1, 2005, Yamaga, along with the village of Ōta (from Nishikunisaki District), was merged into the expanded city of Kitsuki.

Dissolved municipalities of Ōita Prefecture